Single Video Theory is a music documentary directed by Mark Pellington that follows the making of Yield, the fifth album by the American alternative rock band Pearl Jam. It was released first on VHS on August 4, 1998, and then on DVD on November 24, 1998.

Overview
The film was shot in 16mm film over three days in November 1997 in downtown Seattle. It features interviews with the band members and behind-the-scenes footage of the band's rehearsal sessions for its shows opening for The Rolling Stones. The term "single video theory" is a play on the "single-bullet theory," involving the assassination of John F. Kennedy.

The documentary illustrates how the band began to widen the songwriting responsibilities of its members, with bassist Jeff Ament credited with writing "Pilate" and "Low Light", and guitarist Mike McCready taking part in writing "Given to Fly" with vocalist Eddie Vedder. It was the first insight into the band's inner workings of its recording sessions, which had previously been shielded from the public. AllMusic gave it three out of a possible five stars. Allmusic staff writer Perry Seibert said, "The intimate musical performances will interest any fan of the band." Single Video Theory has been certified platinum by the RIAA.

Track listing
"All Those Yesterdays"
"Faithfull"
"Brain of J."
"Given to Fly"
"No Way"
"MFC"
"Wishlist"
"In Hiding"
"Low Light"
"Do the Evolution"

Personnel

Pearl Jam
Jeff Ament – bass guitar
Stone Gossard – guitar
Jack Irons – drums
Mike McCready – guitar
Eddie Vedder – vocals, guitar

Production
Cameron Crowe, Kelly Curtis – executive production
Ellen Dux, Lisa Stewart – associate production
Tom Gorai, Bill Roare – production
Brendan O'Brien – song mixing
Mark Pellington – direction
Adam Schwartz – associate production, editing

Chart positions

References

External links
Single Video Theory information at pearljam.com

1998 films
American documentary films
Films directed by Mark Pellington
Rockumentaries
Pearl Jam video albums
1998 video albums
1990s English-language films
1990s American films